Rietvlei Nature Reserve, located in southern Pretoria, is about  in size, and includes the entirety of the Rietvlei Dam which impounds the Rietvlei River, in Gauteng, South Africa. The reserve is wedged between the R21 highway (OR Tambo Airport highway) on the western side and the R50 (Delmas-Bapsfontein) road on the north-east. The mean elevation above sea level is approximately 1,525 meters, with the highest point at 1,542 m and the lowest at 1,473 m, the dam’s outflow in Sesmylspruit. The reserve covers a surface area of approximately 4,003 ha or 40 km2, of which the dam constitutes some 20ha. A network of roads criss-cross the entire area, which facilitates access to visitors and management.

Flora and fauna

Trees
Both indigenous and exotic species of trees can be found in the reserve.

 Indigenous

 Common hook thorn Acacia caffra
 Sweet thorn Acacia karroo
 Sagewood Buddleja salviifolia
 White stinkwood Celtis africana
 River bushwillow Combretum erythrophyllum
 Highveld cabbage tree Cussonia paniculata
 Sicklebush Dichrostachys cinerea
 Bushveld bluebush Diospyros lycioides
 Puzzle bush Ehretia rigida
 Blue guarri Euclea crispa
 Pioneer spike-thorn Gymnosporia buxifolia
 Honeyscented protea Protea welwitschii
 Dogwood Rhamnus prinoides
 Nana-berry Searsia dentata
 Grassveld currant Searsia discolor
 Karee Searsia lancea
 Rock currant Searsia magalismontana
 Common wild currant Searsia pyroides
 Blue currant Searsia zeyheri
 Buffalothorn Ziziphus mucronata

Exotic
 Green wattle Racosperma decurrens
 Black wattle Racosperma mearnsii
 Red river gum Eucalyptus camaldulensis
 Bluegum Eucalyptus sp.
 Privet Ligustrum sp.
 Mulberry Morus sp.
 Ink berry Phytolacca octandra
 Platanus Platanus sp.
 White poplar Populus alba
 Oak Quercus sp.
 Black locust Robinia pseudoacacia
 Weeping willow Salix babylonica

Birds
Some 404 species of bird utilize the reserve. Birds commonly encountered include colonies of southern masked-weaver, the invasive common myna and conspicuous pied crow, buffy pipit, blacksmith and crowned lapwing on short or burnt grassland, and Cape longclaw and rufous-naped lark in denser grassland or shrubby areas. Amur falcon and barn swallow occur annually in summer. Black-shouldered kite, spotted thick-knee, cattle egret, helmeted guineafowl, Swainson's spurfowl, African palm-swift, southern red bishop, anteating chat, stone chat, capped wheatear, fork-tailed drongo and pied starling are resident or regularly seen species. Some special or less commonly seen species are Alpine swift in winter, African yellow warbler in shrubs along the flood plain, great crested grebe and maccoa duck at the dams, African cuckoo hawk, Peregrine falcon, red-throated wryneck and orange-breasted waxbill.

Mammals
The reserve carries around 1,600 individual large mammals. Cheetah, blesbuck, black wildebeest, red hartebeest, eland, common zebra, waterbuck, reedbuck, springbuck, mountain reedbuck, steenbok, grey duiker, oribi, leopard, buffalo, and hippopotamus can all be found in the reserve. There are also 4 lionesses and 2 male lions kept in a separate enclosure on the reserve.  In October 2019, the Rietvlei lions were killed by poachers and since then, no lions have been kept at the reserve.  

 Aardvark Orycteropus afer
 Aardwolf Proteles cristatus
 African buffalo Syncerus caffer
 African civet civettictis civetta
 African clawless otter Aonyx capensis
 African pygmy mouse Mus minutoides
 African striped weasel Poecilogale albinucha
 African yellow bat Scotophilus dinganii
 Angoni vlei rat Otomys angoniensis
 Black-backed jackal Canis mesomelas
 Black rat Rattus rattus
 Black wildebeest Connochaetes gnou
 Blasius's horseshoe bat Rhinolophus blasii
 Blesbuck Damaliscus dorcas phillpsi
 Brown hyena Parahyaena brunnea
 Bushpig Potamochoerus larvatus
 Bushveld horseshoe bat Rhinolophus simulator
 Cape genet Genetta tigrina
 Cape hare Lepus capensis
 Cape porcupine Hystrix africaeaustralis
 Cape serotine Neoromicia capensis
 Caracal Caracal caracal
 Cheetah Acinonyx jubatus
 Chestnut climbing mouse Dendromus mystacalis
 Common duiker Sylvicapra grimmia
 Common eland Tragelaphus oryx
 Common genet Genetta genetta
 Common mole rat Cryptomys hottentotus
 Darling's horseshoe bat Rhinolophus darlingi
 Desert pygmy mouse Mus indutus
 Egyptian free-tailed bat Tadarida aegyptiaca
 Egyptian slit-faced bat Nycteris thebaica
 Forest shrew Myosorex varius
 Four-striped grass mouse Rhabdomys pumilio
 Geoffroy's horseshoe bat Rhinolophus clivosus
 Gray climbing mouse Dendromus melanotis
 Greater cane rat Thryonomys swinderianus
 Greenish yellow bat Scotophilus viridis
 Ground pangolin Manis temminckii
 Hartebeest Alcelaphus buselaphus
 Highveld gerbil Gerbilliscus brantsii
 Hippopotamus Hippopotamus amphibius
 House mouse Mus musculus
 Least dwarf shrew Suncus infinitesimus
 Leopard Panthera pardus
 Lesser dwarf shrew Suncus varilla
 Lesser gray-brown musk shrew Crocidura silacea
 Lesser red musk shrew Crocidura hirta
 Marsh mongoose Atilax paludinosus
 Mauritian tomb bat Taphozous mauritianus
 Meerkat Suricata suricatta
 Mohol bushbaby Galago moholi
 Mountain reedbuck Redunca fulvorufula
 Oribi Ourebia ourebi
 Plains zebra Equus quagga
 Reddish-gray musk shrew Crocidura cyanea
 Red rock rat Aethomys chrysophilus
 Rock hyrax Procavia capensis
 Rough-haired golden mole Chrysospalax villosus
 Scrub hare Lepus sexatilis
 Serval Leptailurus serval
 Slender mongoose Galerella sanguinea
 Southern African hedgehog Atelerix frontalis
 Southern multimammate mouse Mastomys coucha
 Southern reedbuck Redunca arundinum
 Springbok Antidorcas marsupialis
 Springhare Pedetes capensis
 Steenbok Raphicerus campestris
 Striped polecat Ictonyx striatus
 Swamp musk shrew Crocidura mariquensis
 Vervet monkey Chlorocebus pygerythrus
 Vlei rat Otomys irroratus
 Waterbuck Kobus ellipsiprymnus
 White rhinoceros Ceratotherium simum
 White-tailed mongoose Ichneumia albicauda
 White-tailed rat Mystromys albicaudatus

Threats to the reserve
The reserve is situated in Gauteng, one of the highest population density areas in South Africa. As such it is constantly under threat by human expansion and development.
 The Ekurhuleni Metropolitan Municipality's proposed Benoni landfill site.
 Upstream pollution of the Rietvlei Dam and wetland areas.

See also
 Rietvlei Dam
 Protected areas of South Africa

References

External links

 City of Tshwane page on Rietvlei
 Friends of Rietvlei
 
 Rietvlei Reserve Website and Guide Comprehensive Community Website and eGuide 

Protected areas of Gauteng
Nature reserves in South Africa